Bill Maher (born 1956) is an American stand-up comedian, television host, political commentator, satirist and author.

Bill or William Maher may also refer to:
 Bill Maher (rower) (born 1946), American rower
 Bill Maher (athletic director), American director of athletics for Canisius College
 Bill Maher (hurler) (born 1994), Irish hurler and Gaelic footballer
 William Maher (hurler) (born 1979), Irish retired hurler, manager and selector
 William H. Maher (1846–1913), American businessman and author
 Will Maher (born 1995), British rugby league footballer